The Philippine Competition Act, officially designated as Republic Act No. 10667, is a Philippine law that was signed into law by President Benigno Aquino III on July 21, 2015, and established the quasi-judicial Philippine Competition Commission to enforce the act.  The act is intended to ensure efficient and fair market competition among businesses engaged in trade, industry, and all commercial economic activities.  It prohibits anti-competitive agreements, abuses of dominant positions, and mergers and acquisitions that limit, prevent, and restrict competition.

History
A comprehensive competition law was first proposed in the late 1980s during the administration of President Cory Aquino.

The Philippines was the only country in ASEAN without a competition law and the integration of ASEAN into a single market was an impetus to pass the act.

Philippine Competition Commission
The Philippine Competition Commission is an independent, quasi-judicial body created to enforce the act. It is attached to the Office of the President of the Philippines. Five commissioners were appointed to the Philippine Competition Commission and sworn in on January 27, 2015:

Arsenio Balisacan (Chairperson)
Stella Alabastro-Quimbo 
Johannes Bernabe
Elcid Butuyan 
Menardo Guevarra

Arsenio Balisacan resigned from his post as Philippine Socioeconomic Planning Secretary and Director General of the National Economic and Development Authority to lead the Philippine Competition Commission. Guevarra left the Commission after he was appointed Senior Deputy Executive Secretary. He was replaced by lawyer Amabelle Asuncion.

References

External links
 Philippine Competition Act on the Official Gazette of the Philippine Government

Competition law
Philippine legislation
2015 in the Philippines
2015 in law
Economy of the Philippines